Dora is an unincorporated community in Ozark County, in the U.S. state of Missouri.  The ZIP Code for Dora is 65637.

History
A post office called Dora has been in operation since 1879. An early postmaster gave the community the name of his daughter, Dora Fischer.

Education
Dora is served by the Dora R-III School District.

References

Unincorporated communities in Ozark County, Missouri
Unincorporated communities in Missouri